The 2016 season is Associação Portuguesa de Desportos' ninety fourth season in existence and the club's second consecutive season in the third level of Brazilian football.

Portuguesa finished the campaign suffering relegation to Série D for the first time in its history.

Players

Squad information

Appearances and goals

Last updated: 24 September 2016
Source: Match reports in Competitive matches, Soccerway

Goalscorers

Last updated: 11 September 2016
Source: Match reports in Competitive matches

Disciplinary record

As of 24 September 2016
Source: Match reports in Competitive matches
 = Number of bookings;  = Number of sending offs after a second yellow card;  = Number of sending offs by a direct red card.

Managers

Transfers

In

Total spending:  R$ 0.00

Out

Total gaining:  R$ 0.00

Balance
R$ 0.00

Notes

Competitions

Campeonato Paulista Série A2

Matches

Copa do Brasil

First round

Second round

Campeonato Brasileiro

Matches

References

External links
Official Site 
NETLusa - blog 

2016 season
Associação Portuguesa de Desportos seasons
Brazilian football clubs 2016 season